The IMS Question and Test Interoperability specification (QTI) defines a standard format for the representation of assessment content and results, supporting the exchange of this material between authoring and delivery systems, repositories and other learning management systems. It allows assessment materials to be authored and delivered on multiple systems interchangeably. It is, therefore, designed to facilitate interoperability between systems.

The specification consists of a data model that defines the structure of questions, assessments and results from questions and assessments together with an XML data binding that essentially defines a language for interchanging questions and other assessment material. The XML binding is used for exchanging questions between different authoring tools and by publishers. The assessment and results parts of the specification are less widely used.

Background
QTI was produced by the IMS Global Learning Consortium (IMS GLC), which is an industry and academic consortium that develops specifications for interoperable learning technology. QTI was inspired by the need for interoperability in question design, and to avoid people losing or having to re-type questions when technology changes. Developing and validating good questions can be time consuming, and it's desirable to be able to create them in a platform and technology neutral format. IMS has less than 800 members and is not the voice for the entire industry. You cannot use the QTI name in anything other that an RFP according to their website.

QTI version 1.0 was materially based on a proprietary Questions Markup Language (QML) language defined by QuestionMark, but the language has evolved over the years and can now describe almost any reasonable question that one might want to describe. (QML is still in use by Questionmark).

Version 2.0 was finalized in 2005 and addressed the item (that is, the individual question) level of the specification only. A draft version of Version 2.1, which covered the structure of tests and results, was also released in 2005. But because Version 2.0 did not address test-level issues and was not compatible with Version 1, and because 2.1 was still under development, adoption of Version 2 was retarded.  This was compounded in 2009 when IMS GLC withdrew the Version 2.1 draft and advised the user community that the only version "fully endorsed" by IMS GLC was 1.2.1, in effect also deprecating Version 2.0. Despite this, after several more drafts, 2.1 was finalized and released in 2012.

The current version is 2.2, which was finalized in 2015, and has subsequently had two minor revisions, 2.2.1 and 2.2.2, the latest of which was in November 2017.  Version 2.2 updated and improved integration with W3C standards such as HTML5, SSML, PLS, CSS, ARIA, and MathML, and otherwise made relatively small changes to the Version 2.1 core specification.

Version 2.x is a significant improvement on Version 1, defining a new underlying interaction model. It is also notable for its significantly greater degree of integration with other specifications (some of which did not exist during the production of v1): the specification addresses the relationship with IMS Content Packaging v1.2, IEEE Learning Object Metadata, IMS Learning Design, IMS Simple Sequencing and other standards such as XHTML. It also provides guidance on representing context-specific usage data and information to support the migration of content from earlier versions of the specification.

Version 3 is now available. 
IMS is now called 1EdTech.

Certification
IMS offers certification of compliance to QTI standards, as noted in the table below.  However, it is only offered to members of the consortium, which costs US$1,000 to US$7,500 per year. There is also a cost to certify your software in addition to the Membership cost. This effectively leaves open source projects without the ability to be certified.

Timeline

Applications with IMS QTI support

See also
 GIFT (file format)

References

External links
 IMS Global Learning Consortium: IMS Question & Test Interoperability Specification
 List of software that implement QTI
 Complete Guide to QTI

XML
XML-based standards